The National Kids-in-Print Book Contest for Students is a literary competition held by Landmark House (formerly Landmark Editions) of Kansas City, Kansas.  It was launched by David Melton, one of the publisher's staff members.

History 
Landmark inaugurated the program in the mid-1980s as The National Written and Illustrated by... Awards Contest for Students, and ran it until 1999.  A year later, future awards were canceled indefinitely, due to falling sales of their titles caused by "the financial crunch in many schools and libraries".  In 2006 and 2007, the company revived it as the David Melton Memorial Written and Illustrated by... Contest for Students, before rebranding it under the current name.

Winners

See also
Lune Spark Young Writers' Short Story Contest
PBS Kids Writers Contest
National Novel Writing Month
Three-Day Novel Contest

References 

Awards established in 1985
American children's literary awards
1985 establishments in Kansas